The Kankrej (Hindi: कंकरेज) is an Indian breed of zebuine cattle. It originates from the arid region of the Rann of Kutch in the state of Gujarat, and in neighbouring Rajasthan. Under the name Kankaraj, it is also present in Tharparkar District, in Sindh, Pakistan. It is also known by the names Bannai, Nagar, Talabda, Vaghiyar, Wagad, Waged, Vadhiyar, Wadhiar, Wadhir and Wadial. It is a dual-purpose breed, used both for draught work and for milk production.

From about 1870 onwards, Kankrej bulls and cows were exported to Brazil, where they were used to create the Guzerá breed, which was later among the breeds from which the American Brahman developed.

Gallery

See also
 Ankole-Watusi

References

Cattle breeds originating in India
Animal husbandry in Gujarat
Fauna of Gujarat
Cattle breeds